Patrice Lumumba Square  is a large central plaza in Bamako, the capital and largest city of Mali. The square has a life-size statue of its namesake,  the Congolese independence leader Patrice Lumumba, a park with fountains, and a flag display. Around Lumumba Square are various businesses, embassies, including the French Embassy, and Bamako's largest bank.

References

Bamako